Kia May Pegg (born 29 June 2000) is an English actress and television presenter, known for her role as Jody Jackson in the British children's drama show Tracy Beaker Returns (2012) and its follow-up series spin-off The Dumping Ground (2013–2022). Pegg made her debut as a presenter for CBBC live links in 2021 and has appeared on various programming for the channel. Then in 2022, she began appearing in the BBC soap opera Doctors as Scarlett Kiernan.

Life and career
Pegg was born in Birmingham on 29 June 2000 to boxing trainer and promoter, Jonathan and Rachel Pegg and has two younger brothers. Pegg began training at Birmingham Stage School Showbiz. In 2008, she made an appearance on The Legend of Dick and Dom, as well as a small role in Horrid Henry: The Movie in which she played Vicious Vicky, also known as Sour Susan's younger sister. Pegg also played a character named Peewee in the film The Quiet One, which was produced for film festivals. The other film she was in was entitled Toast, in which she played The Milk Girl. Then in 2012, she portrayed Jody Jackson in the CBBC drama Tracy Beaker Returns, later reprising her role in the follow-up series The Dumping Ground from 2013. In 2014, Pegg was nominated for a BAFTA in the performance category, for her role as Jody in the second series of The Dumping Ground. In 2022, she filmed her final episode of The Dumping Ground after eleven years on the series. Shortly afterwards, it was announced that Pegg had been cast as receptionist Scarlett Kiernan in the BBC soap opera Doctors, making her first appearance in April 2022.

Filmography

Awards and nominations

References

External links 
 

2000 births
Living people
English child actresses
English television actresses
English soap opera actresses
English television presenters
Actresses from Birmingham, West Midlands
21st-century English actresses
British television presenters
British children's television presenters